Rigobert Gruber (born 14 May 1961) is a German former professional footballer who played as a centre-back or libero.

Gruber retired from football at the age of 26 after suffering a serious knee injury.

Personal life

Career statistics

Club

Honours
Eintracht Frankfurt
 1979–80 UEFA Cup
 1980–81 DFB-Pokal

References

External links
 
 

Living people
1961 births
People from Worms, Germany
German footballers
Footballers from Rhineland-Palatinate
Association football defenders
UEFA Cup winning players
Bundesliga players
Eintracht Frankfurt players
SV Werder Bremen players